Meade Township may refer to the following places in the U.S. state of Michigan:

 Meade Township, Huron County, Michigan
 Meade Township, Mason County, Michigan

See also 
 Meade, Macomb County, Michigan, a small unincorporated community in Macomb Township, Macomb County

Michigan township disambiguation pages